Salman bin Abdulaziz bin Salman bin Muhammad bin Saud Al Kabeer bin Abdulaziz bin Saud Al Saud (born 1 November 1982) is a Saudi Arabian. He is member of the Saudi royal family.

Early life and education
Prince Salman was born in Riyadh on 1 November 1982. He is a member of a cadet branch of Al Saud, Al Kabeer. His mother is Princess Nouf bint Abdullah bin Abdul Rahman whose father, Abdullah bin Abdul Rahman, was the younger brother of King Abdulaziz, founder of the KSA. His father is Prince Abdulaziz bin Salman bin Mohammed Al Saud. His great grandfather, Mohammed bin Saud, was the son of Noura bint Abdul Rahman and Suud Al Kabeer.

Prince Salman received his early education at the Najd School in Riyadh and graduated from King Saud University after studying law. He completed his postgraduate studies at Oxford University and obtained a master's Degree in international law at Saint Clements University. He received a PhD degree in international law from the Paris-Sorbonne University. His doctoral thesis was published in French and is entitled, Problèmes de base du droit des entreprises en difficulté: Etude comparée droit français-droit saoudien.

He is fluent in Arabic, English and French.

Business 
Prince Salman established Buonasera Ltd, a private aviation company in 2015 and one of the largest yacht charter company in the south of France, he owns 6 Mega Lürssen yachts. He is CEO of the company. He owns oil and construction business inside Saudi Arabia and in several other countries.

Arrest 
Prince Salman was detained in January 2018, two months after the 2017 Saudi Arabian purge. Salman's father was also arrested two days after his son. People close to him told the Washington Post that he was summoned to the palace in the middle of the night, then beaten and arrested after he arrived. As of November 2018, Salman and his father were still not been released, according to his Paris-based attorney, Elie Hatem, and neither of them were charged as of October 2018. Again, neither were brought to trial, and there was no official recognition of their presence with the Saudi authorities. The lawyer and the family of the two princes confirmed that there were no corruption suspicion against them and stressed that they had been detained because they expressed their opinions.

Sources close to Salman also told The Washington Post that they believed Crown Prince Mohammed bin Salman harbored "personal jealousy" toward Salman.

Salman and his father were held at the al-Ha'ir Prison. His lawyer was in contact with the President of France Emmanuel Macron and the French Foreign Minister Jean-Yves Le Drian to achieve their release. Several members of the royal family campaigned in favor of Macron. The most active was the billionaire Prince Al-Waleed bin Talal who was still under house arrest. Following the assassination of journalist Jamal Khashoggi on 2 October 2018, the family of the two detained expressed grave concern about their fate, because they had not heard any news about them since they were summoned to the Royal Palace 10 months prior.

Personal life
Prince Salman married a daughter of King Abdullah, Oraib bint Abdullah. She is the blood sister of Prince Turki bin Abdullah who has been in detention since November 2017 and Mishaal bin Abdullah, and their mother is Tadhi bint Mishaan Al Jarba.

The net worth of Prince Salman was estimated at 2.7 billion USD in February 2017. Salman collects art pieces from around the world in his palaces. Salman is passionate about horse racing, falconry, camel racing, Japanese culture and E-Sports. He supports the Horse Annual Racing Prize taking place in Riyadh, various E-Sports events, and set up the first camel race in France. He admitted in his personal VK account that he financially contributed to the production of the Dota 2 anime.

Ancestry

References

21st-century Saudi Arabian businesspeople
1982 births
Salman
Living people
People named in the Panama Papers
Salman
Salman
Salman
University of Paris alumni
Dota